The Money Team Racing, also known as TMT Racing, is an American professional stock car racing team that competes in the NASCAR Cup Series. The team is owned by former professional boxer, Floyd Mayweather Jr.. They field the No. 50 Chevrolet Camaro ZL1 part-time for Conor Daly.

History
On October 25, 2019, motorsport journalist Adam Stern posted on Twitter that a new NASCAR team owned by professional boxer Floyd Mayweather Jr. would possibly compete in the final race of the 2019 season at Homestead–Miami Speedway, and would eventually run full-time in 2020. The team would end up not running any races from 2019 and 2020. In 2020, Jeffrey Earnhardt attempted to race in the eNASCAR iRacing Pro Invitational Series for the team, but failed to qualify for the race. In December 2020, the team was in talks with Spire Motorsports, to form a partnership for the 2021 NASCAR Cup Series, and to run a full-time car in 2022. The deal ended up falling through. Former StarCom Racing owners William Woelehmann, Matthew and Michael Kohler were announced as investors in the team.

Cup Series

Car No. 50 history

In late 2019, it was rumored that Mayweather would start a new Cup Series team with his brand The Money Team and would compete at the 2019 Ford EcoBoost 400, along with running full-time in 2020. The team ended up not running any of the races from 2019 to 2020.

In January 2022, it was rumored that the team would be making their Cup Series debut at the 2022 Daytona 500, with Kaz Grala as the driver. On February 1, it was officially announced that the team would attempt to make their debut at Daytona, fielding the No. 50 car for Grala with sponsorship from Pit Viper Sunglasses and Momento NFT. The team made their first start in the race after Grala raced his way in through the duels. On lap 40 of the race, Grala lost his right rear wheel and tire, but he finished the race in 26th place. Due to the wheel loss, crew chief Tony Eury Jr. was suspended for four races. Grala finished 25th at Circuit of the Americas and 23rd at the 2022 Coca-Cola 600. Conor Daly made his Cup Series debut at the Charlotte Roval race, with sponsorship coming from BitNile.

The No. 50 with Daly made the 2023 Daytona 500 starting lineup after finishing 17th in Duel 2 of the 2023 Bluegreen Vacations Duels, despite experiencing handling problems during the qualifying race. He eventually finished 29th out of the 40 car field. At the time of the race finish, Daly’s no. 50 car completed 206 laps of the total 212 laps of the race.

Car No. 50 results

References

2022 establishments in North Carolina
American auto racing teams
Companies based in North Carolina
American companies established in 2022
NASCAR teams